is an informal Japanese-language apology, less polite than the standard "sumimasen".

Film and TV

Ring of Curse, 2011 Japanese horror film, originally released as Gomen Nasai in Japan

Music
"Gomen-nasai" (song), 1951 song with music by Raymond Hattor
, song from TV segment Minna no Uta, 1975
"Gomenasai" (t.A.T.u song), 2005
"Gomenasai" (BWO song), 2008

Japanese words and phrases